Jewels 12th Ring was a planned mixed martial arts (MMA) to be held by MMA promotion Jewels.

Background
It was announced the next day that Ellis had suffered an injury in training and that fellow Bellator season three semi-finalist Jessica Aguilar would face Hamasaki instead.

Fighters Sakura Nomura and Kim did not take part in the weigh-ins and instead were going to be weighed on the day of their match.

Announced card
1st match: Jewels official rules -50 kg bout, 5:00 / 2 R
 Miyoko Kusaka (Grabaka Gym) vs.  Yuka Okumura (Soul Fighters Japan)

2nd match: Jewels official rules lightweight bout, 5:00 / 2 R
 Rina Tomita (AACC) vs.  Sadae Suzumura (Cobra Kai MMA Dojo)

3rd match: Jewels special rules (pound allowed) -65 kg bout, 5:00 / 2 R
 Esui (Smash Alley Gym) vs.  Danielle West (Fuzion MMA)

4th match: Jewels kickboxing rules -52.16 kg bout, 5:00 / 2 R
 Miku Hayashi (Bungeling Bay Spirit) vs.  Suzuna Nakamura (Sakigake Juku)

5th match: Jewels official rules -62 kg bout, 5:00 / 2 R
 Shizuka Sugiyama (Zendokai Yokohama) vs.  Mayumi Aoki (Gamurannac)

6th match: Jewels official rules -58 kg bout, 5:00 / 2 R
 Sakura Nomura (Club Barbarian Impact) vs.  Ji Yun Kim (CMA Korea Team Posse)

7th match: Jewels official rules -54 kg bout, 5:00 / 2 R
 Mika Nagano (Core) vs.  Emi Murata (AACC)

8th match: Jewels special rules (pound allowed) lightweight bout, 5:00 / 2 R
 Ayaka Hamasaki (AACC) vs.  Jessica Aguilar
(American Top Team)

References

External links
Cancellation announcement at Jewels official blog 
Event data at Sherdog

Jewels (mixed martial arts) events
2011 in mixed martial arts
Mixed martial arts in Japan
Sports competitions in Tokyo
2011 in Japanese sport